Znojmo District is a district in the South Moravian Region of the Czech Republic. Its capital is the town of Znojmo.

Administrative division
Znojmo District is divided into two administrative districts of municipalities with extended competence: Znojmo and Moravský Krumlov.

List of municipalities
Towns are marked in bold and market towns in italics:

Bantice -
Běhařovice -
Bezkov -
Bítov -
Blanné -
Blížkovice -
Bohutice -
Bojanovice -
Borotice -
Boskovštejn -
Božice -
Břežany -
Čejkovice -
Čermákovice -
Černín -
Chvalatice -
Chvalovice -
Citonice -
Ctidružice -
Damnice -
Dobelice -
Dobřínsko -
Dobšice -
Dolenice -
Dolní Dubňany -
Dyjákovice -
Dyjákovičky -
Dyje -
Džbánice -
Grešlové Mýto -
Havraníky -
Hevlín -
Hluboké Mašůvky -
Hnanice -
Hodonice -
Horní Břečkov -
Horní Dubňany -
Horní Dunajovice -
Horní Kounice -
Hostěradice -
Hostim -
Hrabětice -
Hrádek -
Hrušovany nad Jevišovkou -
Jamolice -
Jaroslavice -
Jevišovice -
Jezeřany-Maršovice -
Jiřice u Miroslavi -
Jiřice u Moravských Budějovic -
Kadov -
Korolupy -
Kravsko -
Křepice -
Krhovice -
Křídlůvky -
Kubšice -
Kuchařovice -
Kyjovice -
Lančov -
Lechovice -
Lesná -
Lesonice -
Litobratřice -
Lubnice -
Lukov -
Mackovice -
Mašovice -
Medlice -
Mikulovice -
Milíčovice -
Miroslav -
Miroslavské Knínice -
Morašice -
Moravský Krumlov -
Našiměřice -
Němčičky -
Nový Šaldorf-Sedlešovice -
Olbramkostel -
Olbramovice -
Oleksovice -
Onšov -
Oslnovice -
Pavlice -
Petrovice -
Plaveč -
Plenkovice -
Podhradí nad Dyjí -
Podmolí -
Podmyče -
Práče -
Pravice -
Přeskače -
Prokopov -
Prosiměřice -
Rešice -
Rozkoš -
Rudlice -
Rybníky -
Šafov -
Šanov -
Šatov -
Skalice -
Slatina -
Slup -
Stálky -
Starý Petřín -
Štítary -
Stošíkovice na Louce -
Strachotice -
Střelice -
Suchohrdly u Miroslavi -
Suchohrdly -
Šumná -
Tasovice -
Tavíkovice -
Těšetice -
Trnové Pole -
Trstěnice -
Tulešice -
Tvořihráz -
Uherčice -
Újezd -
Únanov -
Valtrovice -
Vedrovice -
Velký Karlov -
Vémyslice -
Vevčice -
Višňové -
Vítonice -
Vracovice -
Vranov nad Dyjí -
Vranovská Ves -
Vratěnín -
Vrbovec -
Výrovice -
Vysočany -
Zálesí -
Zblovice -
Želetice -
Žerotice -
Žerůtky -
Znojmo

Geography

Znojmo District borders Austria in the south. The area is characterized by a slightly undulating and sparsely forested landscape. The area is characterized by a slightly undulating and sparsely wooded landscape, with an above-average share of agricultural land and above-average temperatures. The territory extends into two geomorphological mesoregions: Jevišovice Uplands (most of the territory), Dyje–Svratka Valley (west) and Bobrava Highlands (small part in the northeast).

The most important river is the Thaya, which flows across the southern part of the district. The Jevišovka flows through the central part and joins Thaya just behind the district border. The Rokytná, a tributary of the Jihlava, flows through the northern part. Otherwise, there are not many bodies of water.

Along the Czech-German border is the Podyjí National Park, the smallest Czech national park.

Demographics

Most populated municipalities

Economy
The largest employers with its headquarters in Znojmo District and at least 500 employers are:

The district is known for viticulture and fruit growing. Large part of the district belongs to the Znojmo wine sub-region.

Transport
There are no motorways passing through the district. The most important roads are the I/38 (part of European route E59) from Jihlava to Znojmo and Czech-Austrian border, and I/53 from Znojmo to Brno.

Sights

The most important monuments in the district, protected as national cultural monuments, are:
Rotunda of Saint Catherine in Znojmo
Watermill in Slup
Bítov Castle
Uherčice Castle
Vranov nad Dyjí Castle with the ruins of Nový Hrádek Castle
Louka Monastery in Znojmo
Moravský Krumlov Castle

The best-preserved settlements and landscapes, protected as monument reservations and monument zones, are:
Znojmo (monument reservation)
Jevišovice
Moravský Krumlov
Šatov
Vratěnín
Vranovsko-Bítovsko landscape

The most visited tourist destinations are the Bítov Castle and Vranov nad Dyjí Castle with the ruins of Nový Hrádek Castle.

References

External links

Znojmo District profile on the Czech Statistical Office's website

 
Districts of the Czech Republic